Maurice Acker (born June 25, 1987) is an American professional basketball player for Lille Métropole BC. He was a standout college player for the Marquette Golden Eagles. He played high school basketball at Hillcrest High School, a teammate of Marquette alumni Jerel McNeal.  He was drafted in the eighth round of the 2010 NBA D League Draft by the Bakersfield Jam, but was waived in November of that year.

College career
Maurice averaged 9.2 points, 4.6 assists and 2.4 rebounds in 31.7 minutes and started in all 28 games as a freshman at Ball State University. He was named Mid-American Conference Freshman of the Year in 2005–06. After his freshman season he transferred to Marquette University and sat out the 2006–07 season before suiting up as a sophomore in 2007–08. In the 2008–09 season, Acker took over the starting point guard position because regular starter Dominic James broke his ankle in a loss to the Connecticut Huskies, and started the rest of the season in his place.  He started almost every game in the 2009–10 season, averaging 29.2 minutes, 8.7 points, 3.7 assists, and an impressively low 1.2 turnovers per game.

The Basketball Tournament
Acker played for the Golden Eagles in the 2018 edition of The Basketball Tournament (TBT). In five games, he averaged 14.8 points, 7.8 assists, and played team-leading 28.8 minutes per game all while shooting 50 percent from the field. The Golden Eagles reached the semi-finals before falling to Overseas Elite. In 2020, Acker was a member of the Golden Eagles team that won the tournament.

References
French League profile
gomarquette.com- Maurice Acker profile
Eurobasket.com Profile

1987 births
Living people
American expatriate basketball people in Canada
American expatriate basketball people in Denmark
American expatriate basketball people in France
American expatriate basketball people in Poland
American expatriate basketball people in Slovakia
American expatriate basketball people in the Netherlands
American expatriate basketball people in Venezuela
American men's basketball players
Bakken Bears players
Ball State Cardinals men's basketball players
Basketball players from Illinois
Dutch Basketball League players
HTV Basket players
Marquette Golden Eagles men's basketball players
Matrixx Magixx players
Point guards
Sportspeople from Cook County, Illinois
Trefl Sopot players